Ursula Flora Schneider (Wolff) (popularly known as Ursula Wolff Schneider) (August 14, 1906 – August 1977) was a German photographer and photojournalist. Her photographs of the pre-World War II period are a significant record of the society and culture of Weimar Germany, and they serve as an important example of early photojournalism.

Biography 
Ursula Wolff was born in Berlin, Germany, and is the daughter of renowned Sanskrit scholar Dr. Fritz Wolff and Minna Wolff. She was married to German architect Karl Schneider (de).

In the mid-to-late 1920s, Ursula Wolff spent two years in Berlin, Vienna, and Hamburg working as an apprentice in photographers' studios and honing her talents. In 1928 – at the age of 22 – she established her own studio, Foto Wolff Lichtbildwerkstatt, and began working as a free-lance photographer.

She left Germany and emigrated to the United States in 1937. She spent her life in Chicago and was killed August 4, 1977 in an automobile accident.

Career 
She lived in Chicago, where she worked as a medical photographer at the Michael Reese Hospital from 1937 to 1942. Ursula Schneider was the Photographer of the Oriental Institute from 1942 until her retirement in 1973.

Collections containing her work 
Collections With Images by Ursula Wolff Schneider:
 Deutsches Archeological Institut, Rome, Italy
 Kunsthistorisches Institut in Florenz, Florenz, Italy
 Kunsthistorisches Institut, Marburg, Germany
 Altes Museum, Berlin, Germany
 National Gallerie, Berlin, Germany
 Kronprinzenpalais, Berlin, Germany
 Warburg Haus, Hamburg, Germany
 Warburg Institute, London, UK
 British Museum, London, UK
 University of London, UK
 Metropolitan Museum, New York, NY
 Museum of Fine Arts, Boston, MA
 William Hayes Fogg Art Museum, Cambridge, MA
 Harvard Art Museums, Cambridge, MA
 Columbia University, New York, NY
 University of Illinois, Champaign, IL

External links 
 Family Tree at GENI

Sources 

1906 births
1977 deaths
German photojournalists
German women photographers
Oriental studies
Road incident deaths in Illinois
Photographers from Berlin
Photographers from Illinois
Women photojournalists